Gaa may refer to:
 Gaa language, a language of Nigeria
 gaa, the ISO 639 code for the Ga language of Ghana

GAA may stand for:

Compounds
 Glacial (water-free), acetic acid
 Acid alpha-glucosidase, also known as glucosidase, alpha; acid, an enzyme
 a codon for glutamic acid

Government
 GADA 601, Argentine Army unit  Grupo de Artillería Antiaérea 601 (Anti-Aircraft Artillery Group 601)
 General Allotment Act, US law passed in 1887 regarding Indian land
 Group Areas Acts, South African apartheid laws 
 General Appropriation Act, the legislative act used in some countries for a national or state budget

Organisations
 Gaelic Athletic Association, governing body of Gaelic games such as hurling and Gaelic football
 Gay Activists Alliance, New York City gay rights organisation 1969–81
 Gemmological Association of Australia, an educational organisation based in Sydney
 Global Accounting Alliance, an accounting organisation
 Global Action on Aging, a non-profit organisation based at the United Nations
 Global Aquaculture Alliance, an international non-profit trade association
 Grenada Athletic Association, the governing body for the sport of athletics in Grenada
 Guam Adventist Academy, a private school in Guam

Other uses
 GAA, the ICAO airline code for Business Express Airlines
 Gaelic football, an Irish team sport commonly known as GAA
 Generic Authentication Architecture, a mobile phone specification
 Goals against average, goalkeeping statistic used by several sports and many leagues
 Ford GAA engine
 Gate-all-around, a specific type of 3D transistors